This is a list of Estonian fish.  Native (usually synonymous with indigenous) species are considered to be species which are today present in the region in question, and have been continuously present in that region since a certain period of time.
There are no endemic fish species in Estonia (that is, there are no fish species native to only this region).

Petromyzontiformes

Family Petromyzontidae

Sea lamprey, Petromyzon marinus
European river lamprey, Lampetra fluviatilis
Brook lamprey, Lampetra planeri

Acipenseriformes

Family Acipenseridae
European sea sturgeon, Acipenser sturio

Clupeiformes

Family Clupeidae
Atlantic herring, Clupea harengus membras
European sprat, Sprattus sprattus balticus
Twait shad, Alosa fallax

Family Engraulidae
European anchovy, Engraulis encrasicholus

Salmoniformes

Family Salmonidae
Atlantic salmon, Salmo salar
Brown trout, Salmo trutta
Brown trout (riverine form), Salmo trutta morpha fario
Rainbow trout, Oncorhynchus mykiss
Vendace, Coregonus albula
Northern whitefish, Coregonus peled
Common whitefish Coregonus lavaretus
 Coregonus lavaretus maraenoides
Grayling, Thymallus thymallus

Osmeriformes

Family Osmeridae
European smelt Osmerus eperlanus
Osmerus eperlanus morpha spirinchus

Esociformes

Family Esocidae
Northern pike Esox lucius

Anguilliformes

Family Anguillidae
European eel Anguilla anguilla

Cypriniformes

Family Cyprinidae
Roach, Rutilus rutilus
Common dace, Leuciscus leuciscus
European chub, Leuciscus cephalus
Ide, Leuciscus idus
Eurasian minnow, Phoxinus phoxinus
Rudd, Scardinius erythrophthalmus
Asp, Aspius aspius
Moderlieschen, Leucaspius delineatus
Tench, Tinca tinca
Gudgeon, Gobio gobio
Bleak, Alburnus alburnus
Spirlin, Alburnoides bipunctatus
Silver bream, Blicca bjoerkna
Carp bream, Abramis brama
Zarte, Vimba vimba
Ziege, Pelecus cultratus
Crucian carp, Carassius carassius
Prussian carp, Carassius gibelio
Common carp, Cyprinus carpio
Grass carp Ctenopharyngodon idella
Bighead carp Aristichthys nobilis

Family Cobitidae
Cobitis taenia
Weatherfish Misgurnus fossilis

Family Balitoridae
Stone loach Barbatula barbatula

Siluriformes

Family Siluridae
Wels catfish Silurus glanis

Family Ictaluridae
Channel catfish Ictalurus punctatus

Beloniformes

Family Belonidae
Garfish, Belone belone

Gadiformes

Family Gadidae
Burbot, Lota lota
Pollock, Pollachius pollachius
Atlantic cod, Gadus morhua callarias

Family Phycidae
Four-bearded rockling Rhinonemus cimbrius

Gasterosteiformes

Family Gasterosteidae
Three-spined stickleback, Gasterosteus aculeatus
Nine-spined stickleback, Pungitius pungitius
Fifteen-spined stickleback, Spinachia spinachia

Family Sungnathidae
Straightnose pipefish, Nerophis ophidion
Deepnosed pipefish, Syngnathus typhle

Perciformes

Family Percidae
Zander, Sander lucioperca
European perch, Perca fluviatilis
Eurasian Ruffe, Gymnocephalus cernuus

Family  Stichaeidae
Snake blenny, Lumpenus lampetraeformis

Family Pholididae
Butterfish, Pholis gunnellus

Family Zoarcidae
Viviparous eelpout, Zoarces viviparus

Family Ammodytidae
Lesser sand eel, Ammodytes tobianus
Great sandeel, Hyperoplus lanceolatus

Family Gobiidae
Black goby, Gobius niger
Sand goby, Pomatoschistus minutus
Common goby, Pomatoschistus microps
Twospotted goby, Coryphopterus flavescens
Neogobius melanostomus

Family Trichiuridae
Atlantic mackerel, Scomber scomber

Family Xiphiidae
Swordfish, Xiphias gladius

Scorpaeniformes

Family Cottidae
Fourhorn sculpin, Triglopsis quadricornis
Father Lasher, Myoxocephalus scorpius
Long-spined Sea Scorpion, Taurulus bubalis
European bullhead, Cottus gobio

Family Cyclopteridae
Lumpsucker, Cyclopterus lumpus

Family Liparidae
Snailfish, Liparis liparis

Pleuronectiformes

Family Scophthalmidae
Turbot, Scophthalmus maximus

Family Pleuronectidae
Common dab, Limanda limanda
European plaice, Pleuronectes platessa
European flounder, Platichtys flesus trachurus

References
E. Ojaveer, E. Pihu, T. Saat. Fishes of Estonia, 2003.

Estonia
Fish
Fish
Estonia